Scarabaeoidea is a superfamily of beetles, the only subgroup of the infraorder Scarabaeiformia. Around 35,000 species are placed in this superfamily and some 200 new species are described each year.  Its constituent families are also undergoing revision presently, and the family list below is only preliminary.

The oldest confirmed member of the group is Alloioscarabaeus from the Middle Jurassic Jiulongshan Formation of Inner Mongolia, China.

Families
The following families are listed in Bouchard (2011):

 Belohinidae Paulian, 1959
 Diphyllostomatidae Holloway, 1972 (false stag beetles)
 Geotrupidae Latreille, 1802 (earth-boring dung beetles)
 Glaphyridae MacLeay, 1819 (bumble bee scarab beetles)
 Glaresidae Kolbe, 1905 (enigmatic scarab beetles)
 Hybosoridae Erichson, 1847 (scavenging scarab beetles)
 inclusive of Ceratocanthidae  (pill scarab beetles)
 Lucanidae Latreille 1804 (stag beetles)
 Ochodaeidae Mulsant and Rey 1871 (sand-loving scarab beetles)
 Passalidae Leach, 1815 (bess beetles)
 Pleocomidae LeConte 1861 (rain beetles)
 Scarabaeidae Latreille 1802 (scarab beetles)
 Trogidae MacLeay 1819 (hide beetles)
† Coprinisphaeridae Genise, 2004 (ichnotaxon)
† Pallichnidae Genise, 2004 (ichnotaxon)
† Passalopalpidae Boucher, et al., 2016

See also
 List of subgroups of the order Coleoptera
In Peru alone, there are 1042 known species of Scarabaeoidea as of 2015. This is due to Peru's high biodiversity and endemism.

References

External links

  Checklist of the Scarabaeoidea of the Nearctic Realm (2003)
 Scarabs of the Levant
 Scarabaeoidea Movies from Tree of Life Project
 Scarabeoidea of Italy

Beetle superfamilies
 
Taxa named by Pierre André Latreille